A reuptake inhibitor (RI) is a type of drug known as a reuptake modulator that inhibits the plasmalemmal transporter-mediated reuptake of a neurotransmitter from the synapse into the pre-synaptic neuron. This leads to an increase in extracellular concentrations of the neurotransmitter and  an increase in neurotransmission. Various drugs exert their psychological and physiological effects through reuptake inhibition, including many antidepressants and psychostimulants.

Most known reuptake inhibitors affect the monoamine neurotransmitters serotonin, norepinephrine (and epinephrine), and dopamine. However, there are also a number of pharmaceuticals and research chemicals that act as reuptake inhibitors for other neurotransmitters such as glutamate, γ-aminobutyric acid (GABA), glycine, adenosine, choline (the precursor of acetylcholine), and the endocannabinoids, among others.

Mechanism of action

Active site transporter substrates

Standard reuptake inhibitors are believed to act simply as competitive substrates that work by binding directly to the plasmalemma transporter of the neurotransmitter in question. They occupy the transporter in place of the respective neurotransmitter and competitively block it from being transported from the nerve terminal or synapse into the pre-synaptic neuron. With high enough doses, occupation becomes as much as 80–90%. At this level of inhibition, the transporter will be considerably less efficient at removing excess neurotransmitter from the synapse and this causes a substantial increase in the extracellular concentrations of the neurotransmitter and therefore an increase in overall neurotransmission.

Allosteric site transporter substrates
Alternatively, some reuptake inhibitors bind to allosteric sites and inhibit reuptake indirectly and noncompetitively.

Phencyclidine and related drugs such as benocyclidine, tenocyclidine, ketamine, and dizocilpine (MK-801), have been shown to inhibit the reuptake of the monoamine neurotransmitters. They appear to exert their reuptake inhibition by binding to vaguely characterized allosteric sites on each of the respective monoamine transporters. Benztropine, mazindol, and vanoxerine also bind to these sites and have similar properties. In addition to their high affinity for the main site of the monoamine transporters, several competitive transporter substrates such as cocaine and indatraline have lower affinity for these allosteric sites as well.

A few of the selective serotonin reuptake inhibitors (SSRIs) such as the dextro-enantiomer of citalopram appear to be allosteric reuptake inhibitors of serotonin. Instead of binding to the active site on the serotonin transporter, they bind to an allosteric site, which exerts its effects by causing conformational changes in the transporter protein and thereby modulating the affinity of substrates for the active site. As a result, escitalopram has been marketed as an allosteric serotonin reuptake inhibitor. Notably, this allosteric site may be directly related to the above-mentioned PCP binding sites.

Vesicular transporter substrates

A second type of reuptake inhibition affects vesicular transport, and blocks the intracellular repackaging of neurotransmitters into cytoplasmic vesicles. In contrast to plasmalemmal reuptake inhibitors, vesicular reuptake inhibitors do not increase the synaptic concentrations of a neurotransmitter, only the cytoplasmic concentrations; unless, that is, they also act as plasmalemmal transporter reversers via phosphorylation of the transporter protein, also known as a releasing agent. Pure vesicular reuptake inhibitors tend to actually lower synaptic neurotransmitter concentrations, as blocking the repackaging of, and storage of the neurotransmitter in question leaves them vulnerable to degradation via enzymes such as monoamine oxidase (MAO) that exist in the cytoplasm. With vesicular transport blocked, neurotransmitter stores quickly become depleted.

Reserpine (Serpasil) is an irreversible inhibitor of the vesicular monoamine transporter 2 (VMAT2), and is a prototypical example of a vesicular reuptake inhibitor.

Indirect unknown mechanism 
Two of the primary active constituents of the medicinal herb Hypericum perforatum (St. John's Wort) are hyperforin and adhyperforin. Hyperforin and adhyperforin are wide-spectrum inhibitors of the reuptake of serotonin, norepinephrine, dopamine, glutamate, GABA, glycine, and choline, and they exert these effects by binding to and activating the transient receptor potential cation channel TRPC6. Activation of TRPC6 induces the entry of calcium (Ca2+) and sodium (Na+) into the cell, which causes the effect through unknown mechanism.

Types

Typical
 Amino acid reuptake inhibitor
 Excitatory amino acid reuptake inhibitor (or glutamate-aspartate reuptake inhibitor)
 GABA reuptake inhibitor
 Glycine reuptake inhibitor
 Monoamine reuptake inhibitor
 Dopamine reuptake inhibitor
 Norepinephrine reuptake inhibitor
 Serotonin reuptake inhibitor
 Serotonin-norepinephrine reuptake inhibitor
 Norepinephrine-dopamine reuptake inhibitor
 Serotonin-dopamine reuptake inhibitor
 Serotonin-norepinephrine-dopamine reuptake inhibitor
 Miscellaneous
 Adenosine reuptake inhibitor
 Endocannabinoid reuptake inhibitor

Atypical
 TRPC6 activators (wide-spectrum reuptake inhibitors) – hyperforin, adhyperforin

Plasmalemmal
 Choline reuptake inhibitor – hemicholinium-3, triethylcholine

Vesicular
 Vesicular acetylcholine transporter (VAChT) inhibitor – vesamicol
 Vesicular monoamine transporter (VMAT) inhibitor – reserpine, tetrabenazine

See also
 Releasing agent

References

Neuropharmacology
Pharmacodynamics